Pittier is a district of the Coto Brus canton, in the Puntarenas province of Costa Rica.

History 
Pittier was created on 29 November 1988 by Acuerdo 428.

Geography 
Pittier has an area of  km² and an elevation of  metres.

Demographics 

For the 2011 census, Pittier had a population of  inhabitants.

Transportation

Road transportation 
The district is covered by the following road routes:
 National Route 246
 National Route 612

References 

Districts of Puntarenas Province
Populated places in Puntarenas Province